The 1917 Norwich by-election was held on 26 August 1917. The by-election was held due to the incumbent Labour MP, George Roberts, becoming Minister of Labour.

The Norwich Labour Party and Trades Council repudiated Roberts because he accepted office in the Coalition Government. However, the National Executive of the Labour Party endorsed him, so he stood as an official Labour Party candidate. Due to the wartime electoral truce between the main parties, Roberts was returned unopposed.

Results

References

Elections in Norwich
By-elections to the Parliament of the United Kingdom in Norfolk constituencies
Unopposed ministerial by-elections to the Parliament of the United Kingdom
1917 elections in the United Kingdom
1917 in England
20th century in Norfolk
August 1917 events
Ministerial by-elections to the Parliament of the United Kingdom